Blood Pact may refer to:
 Blood Pact, a 1993 book by Tanya Huff from the series Blood Books
 Blood Pact, a 2009 book by Dan Abnett from the series Gaunt's Ghosts
 Blood Pact, a 2013 book by Sharon Rose Mayes
 Blood Pact, a 2018 Brazilian crime drama television series.

See also
 Blood oath (ritual)
 Blood compact, an ancient ritual of the Philippines
  - The blood seal pacts are signed with blood seals what the contractors should accomplish in Japan.